The Ranger-class tanker was a series of six tankers built for the Royal Fleet Auxiliary.

 , built by Harland and Wolff
 , built by Harland and Wolff
 , built by Harland and Wolff
 , built by Caledon Shipbuilding & Engineering Company
 , built by Caledon Shipbuilding & Engineering Company
 , built by Caledon Shipbuilding & Engineering Company

References
 Ranger Class Attendant Tankers

 
 Ranger
Auxiliary replenishment ship classes